The Stonehenge Formation is a geologic formation in Pennsylvania. It preserves fossils dating back to the Ordovician period.

See also

 List of fossiliferous stratigraphic units in Pennsylvania
 Paleontology in Pennsylvania

References
 

Ordovician geology of Pennsylvania
Ordovician geology of New Jersey
Ordovician southern paleotemperate deposits